Sigsbee is an unincorporated community in Shelby County, in the U.S. state of Missouri.

History
A post office called Sigsbee was established in 1898, and remained in operation until 1906. The community has the name of Charles Dwight Sigsbee, a former Rear Admiral in the United States Navy.

References

Unincorporated communities in Shelby County, Missouri
Unincorporated communities in Missouri